Stenoplastis is a genus of moths of the family Notodontidae. It consists of the following species:
Stenoplastis carderi  (Druce, 1899) 
Stenoplastis decorata  Dognin, 1909
Stenoplastis dyeri  Miller, 2008
Stenoplastis flavibasis  Hering, 1925
Stenoplastis flavinigra  (Dognin, 1910) 
Stenoplastis satyroides  C. and R. Felder, 1874

Notodontidae of South America